The 2007 France rugby union tour of new Zealand was a series of matches played in June 2007 in new Zealand by France national rugby union team.

The final rounds of the 2006–07 Top 14 season conflicted with the tour, so France sent a Test team short of 30 of their top players. The team was labelled "France C" by the New Zealand media. Featuring 11 new caps, France were defeated 42–11 in the first Test at Eden Park. The second Test was played the following week in Wellington, and the All Blacks achieved their largest ever victory over France with a 61–10 win. The defeat was France's heaviest in their history.

Results

Notes

2007
France
tour
France national rugby union team tours
tour